The Offender Management Act 2007 (c 21) is an Act of the Parliament of the United Kingdom.

Section 41 - Commencement
Orders made under this section:
The Offender Management Act 2007 (Commencement No.1 and Transitional Provisions) Order 2007 (S.I. 2007/3001 (C.117))
The Offender Management Act 2007 (Commencement No. 2 and Transitional Provision) Order 2008 (S.I. 2008/504 (C.18))
The Offender Management Act 2007 (Commencement No. 3) Order 2009 (S.I. 2009/32 (C.1))
The Offender Management Act 2007 (Commencement No. 4) Order 2009 (S.I. 2009/547 (C.36))
The Offender Management Act 2007 (Commencement No. 5) Order 2010 (S.I. 2010/191 (C.19))

References
Halsbury's Statutes,

External links
The Offender Management Act 2007, as amended from the National Archives.
The Offender Management Act 2007, as originally enacted from the National Archives.
Explanatory notes to the Offender Management Act 2007.

United Kingdom Acts of Parliament 2007
Criminal law of the United Kingdom